Sarun Mahalleh (also Romanized as Sarūn Maḩalleh) is a village in Karipey Rural District, Lalehabad District, Babol County, Mazandaran Province, Iran. At the 2006 census, its population was 112, in 32 families.

References 

Populated places in Babol County